Leptocera fontinalis  is a species of fly in the family Sphaeroceridae, the lesser dung flies. It is found in the  Palearctic. 

The larvae live in a wide range of moist decaying organic materials where they feed on micro-organisms.

References

Sphaeroceridae
Insects described in 1826